Deirdre Griswold is an American communist political activist. She is the editor of Workers World, the newspaper of the Workers World Party, and former candidate for President of the United States. Griswold ran in 1980 as the nominee of the Workers World Party. Her running mate was Gavrielle Holmes.

She is the daughter of Vincent Copeland (deceased in 1993, at 77), one of the founders of the party.  Her mother, Elizabeth Ross Copeland, and paternal aunt, Cynthia Cochran, were also communists. She was married to Andy Stapp.

She has edited communist publication Workers World for several decades.

Griswold stood in for third-party presidential candidate John Parker in the October 15, 2004 third-party candidate debates.

On February 12, 2018, Griswold appeared on Tucker Carlson Tonight, where she defended the government of North Korea.

Bibliography
 China; the struggle within from the pages of Workers World (1972) (with Sam Marcy and Naomi Cohen)
 The Ethiopian Revolution and the Struggle Against U.S. Imperialism (1978)
 Eyewitness Ethiopia: The continuing revolution (1979)
 Indonesia: The Bloodbath that Was (1975)
 Indonesia: The Second Greatest Crime of the Century (1978)

References

Year of birth missing (living people)
Living people
Female candidates for President of the United States
Candidates in the 1980 United States presidential election
20th-century American politicians
Workers World Party presidential nominees
20th-century American women politicians
Editors of New York City newspapers
Writers from New York City
Women newspaper editors
21st-century American women